Itaweret (Ita-the elder) was an Ancient Egyptian king's daughter who lived in the 12th Dynasty around 1850 BC. She is known from her burial next to the pyramid of king Amenemhat II at Dahshur. The burial was found intact and contained a decorated wooden coffin and canopic box with longer religious texts including her name. Some personal adornments were found in the tomb too. The location of the tomb might indicate that she was a daughter of Amenemhat II, but a final proof is missing. Remarkable is the wooden statue of a swan found in her burial apartments.

References 

Princesses of the Twelfth Dynasty of Egypt
19th-century BC women